Azure Data Lake is a scalable data storage and analytics service. The service is hosted in Azure, Microsoft's public cloud.

History 
Azure Data Lake service was released on November 16, 2016. It is based on COSMOS, which is used to store and process data for applications such as Azure,  AdCenter, Bing, MSN, Skype and Windows Live. COSMOS features a SQL-like query engine called SCOPE upon which U-SQL was built.

Azure Data Lake Store 
Users can store structured, semi-structured or unstructured data produced from applications including social networks, relational data, sensors, videos, web apps, mobile or desktop devices. A single Azure Data Lake Store account can store trillions of files where a single file can be greater than a petabyte in size.

Azure Data Lake Analytics 
Azure Data Lake Analytics is a parallel on-demand job service. The parallel processing system is based on Microsoft Dryad.  Dryad can represent arbitrary Directed Acyclic Graphs (DAGs) of computation. Data Lake Analytics provides a distributed infrastructure that can dynamically allocate or de-allocate resources so customers pay for only the services they use.

Azure Data Lake Analytics uses Apache YARN, the part of Apache Hadoop which governs resource management across clusters. Microsoft Azure Data Lake Store supports any application that uses the Hadoop Distributed File System (HDFS) interface.

U-SQL 
Using Data Lake Analytics, users can develop and run parallel data transformation and processing programs in U-SQL, a query language that combines SQL with C#. U-SQL was designed as an evolution of the declarative SQL language with native extensibility through the user code written in C#.  U-SQL uses C# data types and the C# expression language.

See also 
Data lake

References

External links
 Data Lake on Microsoft Azure

Cloud computing
Cloud computing providers
Cloud infrastructure
Cloud platforms
Microsoft cloud services